"Heaven in Our Headlights" is a song by recorded by Canadian pop rock band Hedley for their fifth studio album, Wild Life. The song was issued to radio as the third official single from the album on June 17, 2014, while the music video premiered on June 20. The song sold 82,000 digital copies in Canada as of December 2014.

Background and composition
The song was written by lead singer Jacob Hoggard, Brian Howes and Nolan Sipe. The track runs at 120 BPM and is in the key of C major. Hoggard described the song as a "road trip song."

Music video
The music video for "Heaven in Our Headlights" was released on June 20, 2014. It was directed by Matt Leaf and Jacob Hoggard. The video is set mostly in a desert following a couple on a road trip as well as scenes from their tour, Wild Live.

Awards and nominations

Charts

Weekly charts

Year-end charts

References

2013 songs
2014 singles
Hedley (band) songs
Universal Music Group singles
Songs written by Brian Howes
Songs written by Jacob Hoggard